Carmel Mountain Ranch, sometimes shortened to simply Carmel Mountain, or abbreviated to CMR by local residents and organizations is a community of San Diego, California, United States, in the northeastern part of the city. Despite its name, Carmel Mountain Ranch is actually in the shadow of Black Mountain. Carmel Mountain proper is about 10 miles west of the Carmel Mountain Ranch neighborhood.

Geography
The community is bounded by the city of Poway to the east, and other communities of San Diego on all other sides: Rancho Bernardo to the north, Rancho Peñasquitos to the west, and Sabre Springs to the south.

Economy

Retail
Several shopping centers are located adjacent to one another:
Carmel Mountain Plaza
Carmel Mountain Ranch Town Center
Carmel Mountain Ranch Home Center
Price Plaza (anchored by Costco Wholesale/opened as Price Club in 1992)
The Courtyard at Carmel Mountain Ranch

Commercial
The Carmel Mountain Ranch/Rancho Bernardo submarket is the fifth-largest office space submarket in San Diego County, with over 6 million square feet of office space. It is part of an "I-15 edge city", edge city being a major center of employment outside a traditional downtown.

The Carvin Corporation is headquartered near these centers. The Carmel Mountain Ranch Country Club is a closed golf course located in the community.

In 1993, the United States Postal Service opened the Margaret L. Sellers Processing and Distribution Center. The facility is over 15 acres and employees over 1,500 people. Sorting mail destined as far north as Fallbrook, and as far east as Tecate, during the holiday season the facility processes over 300 million items. It replaced the Midway Processing and Distribution Facility, in the Midway neighborhood, which opened in 1972 and stopped processing regional mail in 1993; that facility was built on the site of the Dutch Flats Airport, once utilized by Charles Lindbergh prior to his transatlantic flight.

Transportation

Thoroughfares
I-15 runs along the western edge of Carmel Mountain, and a noticeable stone marker, complete with sign and flags, is visible from the northbound lanes to act as a gateway immediately before the Carmel Mountain Road exit, which is the primary road serving the community. The eastern terminus of SR 56 becomes Ted Williams Parkway as it enters the community; however, it retains its freeway characteristics until it crosses Rancho Carmel Drive. Transportation access from the eastern end of State Route 56, the Ted Williams Parkway and I-15 express lane exits make this community attractive to area commuters.

Public
There are local bus routes. While Carmel Mountain does not share in the name, the Sabre Springs / Penasquitos Transit Station, which provides direct access to the managed express lanes on I-15, is adjacent to the community.

Community events 

Every year the local Chamber of Commerce, headquartered within the community, hosts a fall festival at which local businesses, community organizations, and school representatives set up information booths and interact with attendees.

Fairway Village, a neighborhood division of Carmel Mountain Ranch running east-to-west on Stoney Gate Place, parallel to Ted Williams Parkway and crossed by Shoal Creek Drive, presents an annual Christmas light show called "Holiday Magic at Fairway Village." The neighborhood lights more than 85 homes from December 1 to January 1. Each year on the Saturday before Christmas, the neighborhood holds an evening block party that is open to the public, where visitors can walk through the neighborhood, enjoy the lights and festivities, and partake of snacks and hot drinks offered by many homes. This event has been featured in several San Diego Family magazine articles. The neighborhood is also very popular at Halloween due to it being a large cul-de-sac street with no hills.

Parks and recreation
Carmel Mountain Ranch Community Park is located just north of Ted Williams Parkway on Rancho Carmel Drive, just east of the 15. Highland Ranch Park is located north of Eastbourne Road and slightly northeast of Highland Ranch Road.

The former Carmel Mountain Ranch golf course sprawls much of the community and has closed its failed business.

Schools

Carmel Mountain Ranch is served by the Poway Unified School District.

High schools
Middle school students at Carmel Mountain Ranch's three middle schools feed into Mt. Carmel High School, Poway High School, or Rancho Bernardo High School.

Middle schools
Elementary students feed into Bernardo Heights Middle School in Rancho Bernardo,  Meadowbrook Middle School, or Black Mountain Middle School in Rancho Peñasquitos.

Elementary schools
 Highland Ranch Elementary
 Shoal Creek Elementary
 Creekside Elementary
 Morning Creek Elementary

Sports 
There is a baseball league for kindergarten - 8th grade.  There are also a youth basketball league and other recreational sports.

References

External links 
Carmel Mountain Ranch Residential Community Association
San Diego Community profile
Carmel Mountain Ranch Town Center
Scouts BSA Troop 667 (boys only)
Scouts BSA Troop 1667 (girls only)

Neighborhoods in San Diego
Edge cities in the San Diego metropolitan area